K VII was a  patrol submarine of the Royal Netherlands Navy. The ship was built by Fijenoord shipyard in Rotterdam.

Service history
The submarine was laid down in Rotterdam at the shipyard of Fijenoord on 25 July 1916. The launch took place on 8 March 1921.
On 5 September 1922 the ship was commissioned in the Dutch navy.

On board K II  was professor F.A. Vening Meinesz who conducted gravity measurements. He left the ship in Colombo. The ships where delayed when Pelikaan ran aground at Tunis.

On 11 December 1923 the ships arrived at Sabang where they stayed until 7 December. On 7 December they set sail for Tanjung Priok where they arrived at 24 December 1923.

World War II
In 1941 at the time of the declaration of war with Japan the boat was in Surabaya where it was kept in reserve. On 18 February 1942 the K VII was destroyed in a Japanese bombing of the Surabaya harbor. At the time of the bombing the boat was submerged in the harbor in an attempt to save the ship from destruction. The attempt failed and all 13 men manning the boat died in the attack.

References

External links
Description of ship

1921 ships
Ships built in Schiedam
K V-class submarines
Maritime incidents in February 1942
Lost submarines of the Netherlands
Submarines sunk by aircraft
Ships sunk by Japanese aircraft